The Kent County Council (Filming on Highways) Act 2010 is a local Act of the Parliament of the United Kingdom that confers powers to Kent County Council relating to filming on highways. The act received royal assent on 27 July 2010. The passing of the act meant that the Kent became the first authority outside of London to gain legal powers to enforce the temporary closure of roads to be used as film locations. The act removed an uncertainty regarding provisions over the Road Traffic Regulation Act 1984 and allows up to six film orders to be issued on any road in Kent in a calendar year. Any order made remains in force for a maximum of seven days with notices lasting twenty-four hours and prevents film crews from being prosecuted for obstructing a stretch of road under the Highways Act 1980.

References

United Kingdom Acts of Parliament 2010
Kent